Goodness is the third studio album by American rock band The Hotelier. After being announced in February 2016, it was released in May through independent label Tiny Engines.

Artwork
The artwork was done by Brooklyn-based artist Xirin. It features a group of elderly people fully nude standing in a field. A censored version used for online retailers was noticeable for its extreme censoring, with the artists stating they took an "all or nothing" approach, saying "Instead of making a version of the image that was digestible or easy on the eyes, we just chose to obscure the photo entirely, to convey that we’re sorry you can’t see it... rather than compromise the image and the meaning behind it."

Critical reception

Goodness received mostly positive reviews from music critics. At Metacritic, which assigns a weighted mean rating out of 100 to reviews from mainstream critics, the album received an average score of 85, based on 10 reviews, which indicates "universal acclaim". Writing for Exclaim!, Conor Mackie gave the album an extremely positive review, hailing it as "their most mature, most complete record to date."

Accolades

Track listing

Personnel
 Christian Holden – bass, vocals, piano, guitar
 Chris Hoffman – guitar, vocals
 Ben Gauthier – guitar, percussion
 Sam Frederick – percussion

References

The Hotelier albums
2016 albums
Tiny Engines albums